Hans Adlhoch (born 10 April 1935) is a German-born Canadian sport shooter. He competed in the 1976 Summer Olympics.

References

1935 births
Living people
Shooters at the 1976 Summer Olympics
Canadian male sport shooters
Olympic shooters of Canada
Sportspeople from Heidelberg
German emigrants to Canada